Igtisadchi Baku is an Azerbaijani women's volleyball club.

History
Igtisadchi Baku was founded in the Summer of 2008 and immediately got the right to participate in the Azerbaijan Super League, qualifying after just one season to the CEV Women's Challenge Cup. The following season saw Igtisadchi Baku eliminated in the second round table of European competition, because of the deployment of an ineligible player in the qualification to the Challenge Cup.

In the season 2009-2010, the club achieved third place in the championship, beating the Azerrail Baku and qualifying for the third consecutive season in the Challenge Cup.

In the season 2012-2013, the club participated in the Women's CEV Volleyball Cup, being eliminated in the 8th final round of the competition. In the 2012/13 Azerbaijani Super League, the club claimed the silver medal, tied with Azerrail Baku.

In 2014, it was announced that team will not participate at 2014-2015 due financial difficulties.

Team 

Season 2013–2014, as of April 2014.

Honours
 Azerbaijan Superleague :
  Runner-up: 2012-13
   3rd place: 2009-10, 2010-11, 2013-14

Former coaches

References

External links

Azerbaijani volleyball clubs
Volleyball clubs established in 2008
2008 establishments in Azerbaijan
2014 disestablishments in Azerbaijan
Sports teams in Baku
Sports clubs disestablished in 2014